Adele Tan Qian Xiu (born 31 March 1999) is a Singaporean sports shooter. She competed in the women's 10 metre air rifle event at the 2020 Summer Olympics.

Sports career
Tan started practicing shooting at the age of 12 and was selected by the Singapore Sports School at a shooting competition.

In 2017, she finished fifth in the women's 10m air rifle at the Asian Shooting Championships in Wako, Japan. At the 2020 H&N Cup in Munich, she won a gold medal in women's 10m air rifle event scoring of 252.7 points and setting a new national record in the process.

In May 2021, the Singapore Shooting Federation announced that Tan would represent Singapore at the  women's 10m air rifle at the 2020 Summer Olympics in Tokyo. During the competition which was held on 24 July 2021 at the Asaka Shooting Range, she attained 21st position with a score of 625.3 and failed to advance to the final.

She is currently a psychology freshman at the National University of Singapore.

References

External links
 

1999 births
Living people
Singaporean female sport shooters
Olympic shooters of Singapore
Shooters at the 2020 Summer Olympics
Place of birth missing (living people)
Competitors at the 2021 Southeast Asian Games
Southeast Asian Games competitors for Singapore